The 203 mm Howitzer Motor Carriage M43 was an American self-propelled artillery vehicle built on a widened and lengthened Medium Tank M4A3 chassis, but with a Continental engine and HVSS that was introduced at the end of the Second World War. The M43 shared the same chassis as the more widely produced M40 Gun Motor Carriage, which instead mounted a 155 mm gun, and were designed by the Pressed Steel Car Company.  A production run of 576 was planned originally, but in the end only 24 were produced and another 24 were converted from M40 hulls. The M43 went on to serve in the Korean War, and was retired after its conclusion.

History
Equipped with a M115 203 mm (8") Howitzer, it was designed to replace the earlier M12 Gun Motor Carriage. Its prototype designation was the T89, but this was changed to the M43 in March 1945.  The 41.5 ton vehicles struggled to keep up with mechanized formations, but were successful when employed in more stationary roles.

Operational Service
A single pilot vehicle was deployed in Europe before the end of World War II and was used in action by the 991st Field Artillery Regiment, first seeing action as part of Zebra Force in February 1945 in the capture of Cologne.

M43s were used in action in the Korean War, where they were well suited to the static fighting there, their high angle of fire permitting them to hit the rear slopes of hills.

Variants
 8 inch Howitzer Motor Carriage M43 -  HMC, standardized August 1945; 48 were built.
 The Army planned to use the same T38 chassis for a family of SP artillery.
 Cargo Carrier T30 - a few built before cancellation in December 1944 to make more chassis' available for GMCs.

Surviving vehicles

 one at the Fort Sill museum, OK
 one in Wyoming, MI
 one in American Society of Military History Museum, South El Monte, CA

Popular Culture 
Despite its small production run, the M43s is featured in the computer games World of Tanks and R.U.S.E.

See also
 List of U.S. military vehicles by model number
 List of U.S. military vehicles by supply catalog designation
 M55 self propelled howitzer

Notes

References
Tech Manual TM9-747
Surviving M40 and M43
 SNL G232

Self-propelled howitzers of the United States
Self-propelled artillery of the United States
World War II self-propelled artillery
World War II armored fighting vehicles of the United States
Cold War armored fighting vehicles of the United States
Tracked self-propelled howitzers
203 mm artillery
Military vehicles introduced from 1940 to 1944